Thomas Patterson (October 1, 1764 – November 16, 1841) was a member of the U.S. House of Representatives from Pennsylvania.

Thomas Patterson (half brother of John Patterson) was born in Little Britain Township, Pennsylvania.  He moved with his parents to Pattersons Mills, Pennsylvania, in 1778.  He engaged in agricultural pursuits and operated a flour mill.  He served as a major general of militia in the War of 1812.

Patterson was elected as a Republican to the Fifteenth Congress and the two succeeding Congresses and reelected as a Jackson Republican to the Eighteenth Congress.  He did not seek renomination in 1824.  He resumed former business pursuits and died in Cross Creek Township, Pennsylvania, in 1841.  Interment in West Middletown Cemetery in West Middletown, Pennsylvania.

Sources

The Political Graveyard

1764 births
1841 deaths
American militiamen in the War of 1812
American militia generals
Democratic-Republican Party members of the United States House of Representatives from Pennsylvania